Baumea preissii is a flowering plant in the sedge family Cyperaceae, which is native to Western Australia.

It blooms between July and December, producing purple-brown flowers.

It is found in swamps and on the margins of lakes and creeks along coastal areas in the Wheatbelt, Peel, South West, Great Southern, and Goldfields-Esperance, where it grows in water-logged silty-sand soils.

References

preissii
Plants described in 1846
Flora of Western Australia